Calvin Harris (born 20 March 2000) is an English professional footballer player who plays as a winger or forward for Major League Soccer club Colorado Rapids.

Early life
Harris was born in Middlesbrough, England. His father, Terry, played for Sheffield United. He moved to Hong Kong at the age of 10.

Harris began his youth career with Hong Kong FC. When he was 14, Harris obtained a scholarship to join the youth academy of New Zealand side Wellington Phoenix. He made his debut for the senior team at the age of 16 in the 2017 Sisters City Cup against Beijing BG. He went on to represent the Phoenix in the HKFC Soccer Sevens in 2016, 2017 and 2018.

While Harris was free to appear in friendly games for Wellington Phoenix, he was unable to play in any organised competitions until he turned 18 due to FIFA laws prohibiting the international transfers of minors. In 2018, having turned 18, he finally began appearing for Wellington Phoenix's reserves in the New Zealand Football Championship, scoring two goals in six games. The Phoenix decided to not sign him to a first team contract for the A-League club as Harris' lack of a New Zealand passport meant they would have been required to use one of their five import slots.

College career 
Going into college, Harris chose Wake Forest over Akron, Elon, and North Carolina. As a freshman, Harris appeared in 23 games for Wake Forest, and scored six goals. He was also named to the 2019 All-ACC Freshman Team. In his second year with Wake Forest, Harris appeared in all nine matches of the fall season, which was shortened due to the COVID-19 pandemic, scoring four goals. Harris was named co-offensive Player of the Week for the week of 21–27 September, and then won the award a second time later.

Club career 
Harris signed a Generation Adidas contract with Major League Soccer, ahead of the 2021 MLS SuperDraft, where he was selected second overall by FC Cincinnati.

Harris made his first appearance for FC Cincinnati in a friendly vs. Louisville City, coming on as a halftime substitute.  His competitive debut came on 14 April 2021 in a 2–2 draw vs. Nashville SC.  He made 14 appearances in his rookie season, but did not record a goal or assist.

On 21 December 2022, Harris was traded to Colorado Rapids in exchange for $200,000 in General Allocation Money, with potential for a further $175,000 in General Allocation Money.

Career statistics

References

External links
 Profile at FC Cincinnati

Living people
2000 births
English footballers
Footballers from Middlesbrough
Association football wingers
Association football forwards
Major League Soccer players
Wellington Phoenix FC players
FC Cincinnati players
FC Cincinnati draft picks
Wake Forest Demon Deacons men's soccer players
MLS Next Pro players
Colorado Rapids players